Ishwar Dayal Mishra is a Nepalese politician and a member of  People's Progressive Party He is also the general secretary of the party. He was born in 1972 in Kapilvastu Kushahwa, Maharajganj.

In the 2008 Constituent Assembly election he was elected to represent Kapilvastu 4 receiving 10,394 votes.

References 

Living people
People's Progressive Party (Nepal) politicians
1972 births

Members of the 1st Nepalese Constituent Assembly